Supaham (born 13 February 1979 in Surabaya, East Java) is an Indonesian footballer. He usually plays as striker and is 170 cm tall. He kind of type player who like adventure or travelling from one football club to other many football club. During last 8 years he was playing for 9 clubs. Persebaya Surabaya, Persekabpas Pasuruan, Persija Jakarta , and Bhayangkara F.C. are elite football clubs which he providing ever. From all football clubs he provided, he never them to top or peak performance.

References

1979 births
Living people
Indonesian footballers
Sportspeople from Surabaya
Association football forwards
Bhayangkara F.C. players
Deltras F.C. players
Persipro Probolinggo players
Yahukimo F.C. players
Persita Tangerang players
Persekabpas Pasuruan players
Persija Jakarta players
Persebaya Surabaya players
Persela Lamongan players